R&I may refer to:

 Race and intelligence
 Remove and install, an operation in auto repair
 Research & Innovation, as in the name of the European Commission Directorate for Research and Innovation  
 Restaurants & Institutions
 Rizzoli & Isles
 Risk & issues, commonly used in project risk management

See also
RI (disambiguation)
RNI (disambiguation)